Ivar Tollefsen (born 23 June 1961) is a Norwegian businessman, the founder of Tollefsen Enterprises and Fredensborg AS.

Early life
Ivar Tollefsen grew up in Asker. At the age of 12, he started delivering papers on four different routes; to do that, he had to wake up at 3:30 am. A few years later, on the money he earned, Tollefsen acquired a DJ set and started performing at neighbourhood school parties. Soon he founded the Tollefsen Enterprises and skipped high school to dedicate himself fully to the business of  renting out DJ-services and event equipment.

Career
In 1985, Tollefsen Enterprises was bought by investment firm Vest Invest for around $2.8 million. In 1994, Tollefsen engaged in real-estate business and bought a 20-apartments building in central Oslo. Later he founded Fredensborg AS, which is one of the largest owners of rental housing, owning more than  apartments across Scandinavia. Since 2020, the company actively has actively invested in foreign property. Only in 2020, controlled by Fredensborg AS, acquired 1732 buildings across Germany.

Ivar Tollefsen is known for his adventurous spirit. In 1991, he set the world speed record for the crossing of Greenland on skis. In 1993, he led some of the first expeditions to climb mountains in Antarctica. In 2009, he finished fourth in the Dakar Rally.

Ivar Tollefsen made the 2022 Forbes Billionaires List with an estimated wealth of $6.4 billion and occupied the 398th position.

References 

1961 births
Living people
Norwegian businesspeople
Norwegian billionaires
20th-century Norwegian businesspeople
21st-century Norwegian businesspeople